This is an overview of the legality of ibogaine by country. Ibogaine is not included on the UN International Narcotics Control Board's Green List, or List of Psychoactive Substances under International Control. However, since 1989, it has been on the list of doping substances banned by the International Olympic Committee and the International Union of Cyclists because of its stimulant properties.

References

Drug control law
Drug policy by country
Entheogens
Ibogaine
Lists by country